Laxá í Kjós (Laxá in Kjós) is a river in the Kjósarhreppur municipality of southwestern Iceland.

It is known for its salmon fishing, particularly where the salmon must traverse up several waterfalls. Brown trout and sea trout are also caught in the river.

The first salmon hatchery in Iceland, established in 1884 by Danish scientist  in the village of Reynivellir, was stocked with 31 spawning salmon captured in the Laxá í Kjós and its main tributary, the Bugða . Other tributaries include the smaller Svínadalsá , Hálsá , and Þverá , all of which flow into the upper section of the river below the Þórufoss.

Waterfalls 
Near where the river enters the Laxárvogur is another small waterfall, the Kvíslafoss .

The Þórufoss was the filming location for a scene in Game of Thrones ("The Laws of Gods and Men:" Season 4, Episode 6) where a dragon attacks a herd of Meereen goats.

References 

Rivers of Iceland